Maurice Serein (1905-1974) was a French film editor.  He was active in the French film industry from 1934 to 1962.

Selected filmography
 Love and Luck (1932)
 The Bureaucrats (1936)
 You Are Me (1936)
 Ménilmontant (1936)
 Claudine at School (1937)
 The Messenger (1937)
 Extenuating Circumstances (1939)
 Latin Quarter (1939)
 Nine Bachelors (1939)
 The Man Who Seeks the Truth (1940)
 The Beautiful Trip (1947)
 The Woman in Red (1947)
 Ruy Blas (1948)
 Du Guesclin (1949)
 Manèges (1950)
 Women Are Angels (1952) 
 At the Order of the Czar (1954)
 Les mauvaises rencontres (1955)
 The Price of Love (1955)
 The Singer from Mexico (1957)
 Tabarin (1958)
 Serenade of Texas (1958)
 Konga Yo (1962)

References

External links

Bibliography
 Hayward, Susan. Simone Signoret: The Star as Cultural Sign. Continuum, 2004.
 Mitchell, Charles P. The Great Composers Portrayed on Film, 1913 through 2002. McFarland, 2004.

1905 births
1974 deaths
French film editors
Film people from Paris